Christian Frederick Schwarz (with spellings including Friedrich and Schwartz or Swartz) (8 October 1726 – 13 February 1798) was a German Lutheran missionary to India. He was known for his linguistic skills, with knowledge of Latin, Greek, Hebrew, Sanskrit, Tamil, Urdu, Persian, Marathi, and Telugu and even used by the British to serve as an emissary of peace and sent to the court of Haider Ali in Mysore. He worked alongside the Indian royal families, tutoring the Raja Serfoji of Tanjore, and was influential in establishing Protestant Christianity in southern India.

Life

Christian was born on 8 October (sometimes given as 22 or 26 October 1726) at Sonnenburg, in the electorate of Brandenburg, Prussia. His father was George Schwartz and his mother Margaret Grunerin. His mother died when he was young and he went to grammar school in Sonnenburg under Mr Helm. He learnt Latin and Greek with some amount of Hebrew which he hoped to improve with studies in the town of Custrin. In 1746 he moved to study at the University of Halle where he met Schulz who had worked in the Madras Mission. Schultz was working on Tamil bible and sought help from Schwarz. Having learned Tamil to assist in a translation of the Bible into that language, he was led to form the intention of becoming a missionary to India. He received ordination at Copenhagen on 8 August 1749, and, after spending some time in England to acquire the English language, embarked early in 1750 for India.

He arrived at Tiruchirapalli on 30 July via Tranquebar. Tranquebar was for some time his headquarters, but he paid frequent visits to Thanjavur and Tiruchirapalli, and in 1766 moved to Tiruchirapalli. Here he acted as chaplain to the garrison, who erected a church for his general use.

There was an explosion of the ammunition dump of East India company in 1761. Lots of Native soldiers died in that.
So for the orphan children of the soldiers he established Bishop Heber School in Trichinopoly. Again there was another ammunition dump explosion in Trichinopoly in 1763. In which all the British soldiers and their wives perished. Only 14 children of the soldiers survived.
So for the orphan children he started a school in the Vestry of St.John's Church. The Church which had been built by the British soldiers.
Later the army gave some land, about five acres adjoining the army garrison to build a proper school. The school was built by the Freemasons who all were British army personnel and civilians who all were also Freemasons.

In 1769, he secured the friendship of the king Raja Tuljaji, who, although he never converted to Christianity, afforded him every countenance in his missionary labours. Shortly before his death he committed to Schwarz the education of his adopted son and successor Sarabhoji (Serfoji). Schwarz taught the prince, Prince Serfoji, and another slightly older pupil Vedanayagam using the gurukulam approach, where the teacher and the pupil live together. Raja Serfoji built a church to show his affection to Schwartz and it is still seen as a symbol of tolerance on the part of that great Mahratta ruler towards different religions.

In 1779, Schwarz undertook, at the request of the British authorities in Madras (present day Chennai), a private embassy to Hyder Ali, the ruler of Mysore. When Hyder invaded the Carnatic, Schwarz was allowed to pass through the enemy's camp without molestation. In 1784 he established an English school in Thanjavur and this school is now known as St.Peter's Higher Secondary School. After twelve years in Tiruchirapalli he moved to Thanjavur, where he spent the remainder of his life. He died on 13 February 1798 just before Serfoji II ascended the throne.  He was laid to rest in St.Peter's Church in Maharnonbuchavadi, Thanjavur. In his tomb there is a tombstone with a short memoir and an elegy in English  written by  Serfoji II.

Legacy
Schwarz's direct success in making converts exceeded that of any other Protestant missionary in India, in addition to which he succeeded in winning the esteem of Muslims and Hindus. The raja of Tanjore erected a monument, executed by John Flaxman, in the mission church, in which he is represented as grasping the hand of the dying missionary and receiving his benediction. A monument to Schwarz by John Bacon was placed by the British East India Company in St Mary's church at Chennai. Schwarz High School in Ramanathapuram has produced notable students, among them Dr. Abdul Kalam, the former President of India.

The following is the wording of the Memorial commissioned by Raja Serfoji

To the memory of the Reverend Christian Frederic Swartz. Born at Sonnenburg of Neumark in the Kingdom of Prussia, the 26th of October 1726, and died at Tanjore the 13th of February 1798, in the 72d Year of his age.
Devoted from his Early Manhood to the Office of Missionary in the East, the similarity of his situation to that of the first preachers of the gospel, produced in him a peculiar resemblance to the simple sanctity of the apostolic character.
His natural vivacity won the affection as his unspotted probity and purity of life alike commanded the reverence of the Christian, Mahomedan and Hindu. For sovereign princes, Hindu, and Mahomeden selected this humble pastor as the medium of political negotiations with the British Government
- Maha Raja Serfojee

Further reading 
 Werner Raupp (Hrsg.): Mission in Quellentexten. Geschichte der Deutschen Evangelischen Mission von der Reformation bis zur Weltmissionskonferenz Edinburgh 1910, Erlangen/Bad Liebenzell 1990, S. 138–163, bes. 160–163 (with introduction, source excerpts, literature to the Dänisch-Hallesche Mission and Christian Friedrich Schwartz).
 Werner Raupp: Schwartz, Christian Friedrich. In: Biographisch-Bibliographisches Kirchenlexikon (BBKL). Band 9, Bautz, Herzberg 1995 cols. 1153–155.

References

External links

Christian Friedrich Schwarz, Apostle to South India
About Abdul Kalam

German Lutheran missionaries
Lutheran missionaries in India
Tamil history
1726 births
1798 deaths
German expatriates in India